Pernille Harder (born 3 September 1977) is a former Danish badminton player from Kastrup-Magleby BK.

Harder competed in badminton at the 2004 Summer Olympics in women's doubles with partner Mette Schjoldager. They beat the Australian pairs Jane Crabtree and Kate Wilson-Smith, but the duo were defeated by Ra Kyung-min and Lee Kyung-won of South Korea in the round of 16.

Achievements

European Championships 
Women's doubles

European Junior Championships 
Girls' singles

Mixed doubles

IBF World Grand Prix 
Women's doubles

Mixed doubles

IBF International 
Women's singles

Women's doubles

Mixed doubles

References

External links 
 
 

1977 births
Living people
People from Odder Municipality
Danish female badminton players
Olympic badminton players of Denmark
Badminton players at the 2004 Summer Olympics
Sportspeople from the Central Denmark Region